Two-Star Tabernacle was a short-lived punk rock band from Detroit. Two-Star Tabernacle consisted of a young Jack White (who later became the founding member of popular rock group The White Stripes), Dan John Miller, Tracee Mae Miller and Damian Lang.

The band's first release came in 1998, and was a 7-inch vinyl with Andre Williams released by Bloodshot Records initially as a limited edition of 500 on white vinyl, then an additional limited edition of 500 on black vinyl <ref>{{Cite web|url=https://www.bloodshotrecords.com/album/jet-black-daddy-7-single|title=Jet Black Daddy (7 Single)|date=20 December 2013|website=Bloodshotrecords.com|accessdate=10 September 2020}}</ref> and  The band's second release came in 2011, and was a 7-inch vinyl recorded around the same time as the first also featuring Andre Williams, released through Jack White's Third Man Records Vault Subscription Service. Several of the band's songs were altered and recorded on the White Stripes' album White Blood Cells and Blanche's album If We Can't Trust the Doctors...''

Bootlegs
There are only two heavily circulated bootlegs, but more are believed to exist. The most common was recorded at The Gold Dollar in Detroit, Michigan on January 16, 1998, and the rarer of the two was recorded at Paychecks in Hamtramck, Michigan, on March 12, 1999.

Live At The Gold Dollar set list

"Who's To Say"
"Itchy"
"Hotel Yorba"
"Worst Time Of My Life"
"Garbage Picker"
"Now Mary" (Early Version)
"Zig Zag Springs"
"Red Head"
"Jesus And Tequila"
"So Long Cruel World"
"Sixteen Tons"

Live At Paychecks set list

"Rank Stranger"
"The Union Forever"
"Who's To Say"
"The Same Boy You've Always Known"
"Zig Zag Springs"
"Rootin' Tootin'"
"Hotel Yorba"
"So Long, Cruel World"
"Plain As Day"
"Wayfarin' Stranger"

References

Alternative rock groups from Michigan
Garage rock groups from Michigan
Musical groups from Detroit
Musical groups established in 1998
Punk blues musical groups
Rock music duos
Third Man Records artists
Bloodshot Records artists